SM U-20 was a German Type U 19 U-boat built for service in the Imperial German Navy. She was launched on 18 December 1912, and commissioned on 5 August 1913. During World War I, she took part in operations around the British Isles. U-20 became infamous following her sinking of the British ocean liner  on 7 May 1915, an act that dramatically reshaped the course of World War I.

Career 

On 7 May 1915, U-20 was patrolling off the southern coast of Ireland under the command of Kapitänleutnant Walther Schwieger. Three months earlier, on 4 February, the Germans had established a U-boat blockade around the British Isles and had declared any vessel in it a legitimate target.

At about 13:40 Schwieger was at the periscope and saw a vessel approaching. From a distance of about  Schwieger noted she had four funnels and two masts, making her a liner of some sort. He recognised her as the Lusitania, a vessel in the British Fleet Reserve, and fired a single torpedo. It hit on the starboard side, almost directly below the bridge. Following the torpedo's explosion, the liner was shattered by a second explosion, possibly caused by coal dust, a boiler explosion, or an explosion in the propulsion system – so large Schwieger himself was surprised. In 18 minutes, Lusitania sank with 1,198 casualties.

Fifteen minutes after he had fired his torpedo, Schwieger noted in his war diary:
I couldn't have fired another torpedo into this mass of humans desperately trying to save themselves."

There was at the time a great controversy about the sinking, over whether Lusitania was smuggling contraband war material to England and over the number of torpedoes Schwieger fired. The Allies and the United States originally thought the U-20 fired two torpedoes. Postwar investigations showed only one was fired.

Before he got back to the docks at Wilhelmshaven for refuelling and resupply, the United States had formally protested to Berlin against the brutality of his action.

Kaiser Wilhelm II wrote in the margins of the American note, "Utterly impertinent", "outrageous", and "this is the most insolent thing in tone and bearing that I have had to read since the Japanese note last August." Nevertheless, to keep America out of the war, in June the Kaiser was compelled to rescind unrestricted submarine warfare and require all passenger liners be left unmolested.

This rock held one of the key navigational markers in the western ocean, the Fastnet Lighthouse, and any ships passing in and out of the Irish Sea would be within visual contact of it.

RMS Hesperian was now beginning a new run outward bound from Liverpool to Quebec and Montreal, with a general cargo, also doubling as a hospital ship, and carrying about 800 passengers when she was attacked off the Fastnet. The History of the Great War: The Merchant Navy, Vol. II, by Hurd, reads:
"Only a few days before, Count Bernsdorff, the German Ambassador, had assured the United States government that passenger liners will not be sunk without warning and without ensuring the safety of the non-combatants aboard providing that the liners do not try to escape or offer resistance."

This time, Schwieger was received with official disgust upon his return to Wilhelmshaven. Brutally beaten and arrested by the Prussian Secret Police after being ordered to report to Berlin to explain himself, he was required to apologise for having sunk another passenger liner in defiance of a direct order not to do so again. He complained about his treatment in Berlin thereafter, whereupon he was again brutally beaten and arrested by the secret police and held in the brig at Wilhelmshaven for 15 days. 

After his death in 1917, Schwieger was forgiven in Berlin. He received Germany's highest decoration, the Pour le Mérite, having sunk 190,000 tons of shipping. The kaiser openly wept, along with scores of others, at his memorial service.

Fate and legacy

On 4 November 1916, U-20 grounded on the Danish coast south of Vrist, a little north of Thorsminde after suffering damage to its engines. Her crew attempted to destroy her with explosives the following day, succeeding, however, only in damaging the boat's bow (see picture) but making it effectively inoperative as a warship.

The U-20 remained on the beach until 1925 when the Danish government blew it up in a "spectacular explosion". The Danish navy removed the deck gun and made it unserviceable by cutting holes in vital parts. The gun was kept in the naval stores at Holmen in Copenhagen for almost 80 years. The conning tower was removed and placed on the front lawn of the local museum Strandingsmuseum St. George Thorsminde, where it still is today.

Novelist Clive Cussler claimed his National Underwater and Marine Agency (NUMA) located the remains of U-20 in 1984, about 400 yards from shore.

Summary of raiding history

See also
Room 40

References

Notes

Citations

Bibliography

External links

U20 at Strandingsmuseum St. George, Thorsminde
Royal Danish Naval Museum 
Photos of cruises of German submarine U-54 in 1916–1918. Great photo quality, comments in German.
A 44 min. film from 1917 about a cruise of the German submarine U-35. A German propaganda film without dead or wounded; many details about submarine warfare in World War I.

Room 40:  original documents, photos and maps about World War I German submarine warfare and British Room 40 Intelligence from The National Archives, Kew, Richmond, UK.

Type U 19 submarines
Ships built in Danzig
1912 ships
U-boats commissioned in 1913
World War I submarines of Germany
RMS Lusitania
Maritime incidents in 1916
U-boats sunk in 1916
World War I shipwrecks in the North Sea